The Basel Historical Museum is one of the largest and most important museums of its kind in Switzerland and a heritage site of national significance. It opened in 1892. The museum is divided into three buildings within the city of Basel: the Barfüsserkirche, Haus zum Kirschgarten and Musikmuseum.

Barfüsserkirche

Location and history 
The main part of the museum is located in the Barfüsserkirche (literally ‘Barefeet Church’) in the centre of the city of Basel. The Barfüsserkirche is a former Franciscan church with its origins in the 13th century. In 1529, during the Protestant Reformation, the site was given to the city. It was then used for multiple purposes, including as a hospital, school, and warehouse. The church was used for worship until 1794. From 1890 to 1894, the church was renovated to house the city's new Historical Museum.

On 20 October 1975, workers discovered a brick-walled grave chamber in front of the choir, containing the mummified corpse of a woman. She was identified as Anna Catharina Bischoff and turned out to be an ancestor of Boris Johnson.

Items in the exhibition 
The museum houses the Upper Rhine’s most comprehensive cultural history collection and the display area covers 6,200 square meters. The exhibition presents objects documenting handicraft traditions and everyday culture from ages past. Its focus is on the late Middle Ages and the Renaissance up to the Baroque period. Leading highlights include: the treasury of the Basel Cathedral, the Basel and Strasbourg tapestries, the fragments of Basel’s dance of death, altars and ecclesiastical graphic works, the estate of Erasmus of Rotterdam, the coin cabinet and glass painting.
The museum also preserves old cabinets of curiosities which have been bequeathed, as Amerbach cabinet and Faesch cabinet, which works great collectors Basel sixteenth and seventeenth century.

Management 
The museum is managed by the canton of Basel-City. Its origins lie with the Amerbach family in the 16th century whose Wunderkammer was bought by Basel 1661 and brought to the public 1671. The cultural history objects of this Wunderkammer, together with the ones of other collections, became the Historisches Museum Basel in 1894.

Haus zum Kirschgarten

Location and history 
Burckhardt sold the house in 1797. In 1951, a museum on domestic culture was installed.

Items in the exhibition 
Most of the 50 exhibition rooms are dedicated to showing typical common living space in Basel during the 18th and 19th century. Shown are varying furnitures, paintings, porcelain and toys and has been extended by a professional collection.

Musikmuseum

Location and history 
The Musikmuseum is situated over the Barfüsserplatz, opposite the Barfüsserkirche. It is located on the site of a former convent.

Items in the exhibition 
In 21 exhibition rooms over five centuries of European music history is displayed. The exhibition has three main points:

 Instruments from the 16th to the 20th century
 Concerts, choirs and dance
 Parades, ceremony and signal-to-noise

See also
 Museums in Basel

Footnotes

External links

 Historisches Museum Basel

Museums established in 1894
Münchenstein
History museums in Switzerland
Museums in Basel
History of Basel
Carriage museums
Cultural property of national significance in Basel-Stadt
Museums in Basel-Landschaft